Gerardo Esquivel Butrón (born 13 January 1966) is a Mexican former footballer who played as a midfielder.

Club career
A longtime member of Necaxa, Esquivel spent twelve years with the club, including its highly successful period in the mid-1990s. Normally a holding midfielder, Esquivel also had the versatility to play in the defensive line. His work freed colleagues Alex Aguinaga and Alberto García Aspe to conduct the offensive maneuvers in midfield. Esquivel won three championships, in 1995, 1996, and the Invierno 1998 season, during his time at Necaxa. He spent his last season at the top level with Puebla.

International career
Esquivel obtained a total of four caps for the Mexico national team between 1988 and 1995, and was a squad member at the 1995 Copa América. He made his debut in a friendly match against El Salvador on 29 March 1988, a heavy 8–0 victory for Mexico. Esquivel did not return to the Mexico national team for seven years, when he earned a recall based on his title-winning season at Necaxa. His final cap came in a 4–0 loss to the United States on June 18, 1995, in the U.S. Cup at RFK Stadium in Washington.

References

External links

1966 births
Living people
Footballers from Mexico City
Association football midfielders
Mexican footballers
Mexico international footballers
1995 Copa América players
Club Necaxa footballers
Club Puebla players
Club León non-playing staff
Club Necaxa non-playing staff
Club América non-playing staff
Cruz Azul non-playing staff
C.F. Monterrey non-playing staff
Club Tijuana non-playing staff
Club Puebla non-playing staff
1995 King Fahd Cup players